Khejuri College, established in 1999, is a college in Baratala, a gram panchayat in Khejuri II, Purba Medinipur district. It offers undergraduate courses in arts. It is affiliated to  Vidyasagar University. The college is recognized by the University Grants Commission (UGC).

See also

References

External links
Khejuri College
Vidyasagar University
University Grants Commission
National Assessment and Accreditation Council

Colleges affiliated to Vidyasagar University
Educational institutions established in 1999
Universities and colleges in Purba Medinipur district
1999 establishments in West Bengal